The National Catholic Invitational Tournament (NCIT) was a men's college basketball tournament played in the late 1940s and early 1950s.  At the time the NCIT was one of the three major college basketball postseason tournaments that included the NCAA, NIT, and NCIT.  In 1949 the NCAA and NIT tournaments featured only eight invites each and the scarcity of post season opportunities allowed the NCIT to provide an option for quality basketball programs without conference affiliations to participate in post season play.  Only Catholic schools were invited to participate.  In the inaugural year sixteen Catholic schools were invited to participate, but the tournament reduced the field to eight teams in 1950.

Champions

1949 National Catholic Invitation Tournament

Regis College captured the inaugural NCIT championship in Denver by defeating St. Francis 51-47.  The Rangers were one of four seeded teams that included Gonzaga, St. Thomas and Siena.  Regis would advance to the finals to play St. Francis of Brooklyn. The Terriers were invited to participate in the tournament featured star Tommy Gallagher. Gallagher was awarded a trophy as the Tournaments outstanding player.  Regis placed three players on the all tournament team.

1950 National Catholic Invitation Tournament
Originally the tournament was to take place at Loyola College in Baltimore, MD from March 15 to March 22 and feature sixteen teams. Yet, because of segregation and protest from St. Francis College about the unequal treatment of its black players, the tournament was moved to Albany, NY and featured eight teams. Creighton was favored to win the tournament, although they had a 13-13 record going into the tournament the Bluejays had the toughest schedule of the eight competing teams.

1951 National Catholic Invitation Tournament
The tournament took place at the Albany Armory in Albany, NY from March 13 to March 17.  St. Francis of Brooklyn appeared in the title game for the third straight year, but this time came away with the championship banner. Ray Rudzinski led the Terriers with 26 points while Vernon Stokes scored 22 and Roy Reardon scored 21.

1952 National Catholic Invitation Tournament
The tournament took place at Rensselaer Polytechnic Institute Field House in Troy, New York, from March 15 to March 22.  Marquette University, under rookie head coach Tex Winter, defeated St. Francis (PA) to capture their first national tournament championship.  The Warriors were seeded second and defeated Iona, St. Francis of Brooklyn before capturing the title.  Coach Winter was the youngest basketball coach in college at the time. The winning Warriors were honored in 2002 for the 50th anniversary of the accomplishment.

References 

College men's basketball competitions in the United States
Postseason college basketball competitions in the United States